Surf Factor 8 is the eighth album released by surf music band The Surfin' Lungs, released in 2016 on Redondo Records. All bar one of the 14 tracks are self-penned, with Clive and Ray – back on drums – contributing one song each, while there is a cover of "Babysitter" by The Ramones. A traditional Lungs album, with songs about the sun, sea, cars and girls, with a surf punk edge and a hard driving bass prevalent throughout, plus a nod to several influences including The Beach Boys, Gary Usher, Blondie and The Ramones.

Track listing 
 Bring On The Summer (Dean, Pearce, Gilling, Webb) – Lead vocals: Chris Pearce
 Art Arfons (Dean, Pearce, Gilling, Webb) – Lead vocals: Chris Pearce
 Don't Take My Baby (Dean, Pearce, Gilling, Webb) – Lead vocals: Chris Pearce
 She Crashed The Prom (Dean, Pearce, Gilling, Webb) – Lead vocals: Chris Pearce
 Beach Beat (Dean, Pearce, Gilling, Webb) – Instrumental
 My First Car (Dean, Pearce, Gilling, Webb) – Lead vocals: Chris Pearce
 Babysitter (The Ramones) – Lead vocals: Chris Pearce
 Roadway Romeo (Dean, Pearce, Gilling, Webb) – Lead vocals: Chris Pearce
 The Girl With The Joey Ramone Tattoo (Dean, Pearce, Gilling, Weazel) – Lead vocals: Clive Gilling
 At The Weekend (Dean, Pearce, Gilling, Webb) – Lead vocals: Chris Pearce
 Not That Kind Of Girl (Dean, Pearce, Gilling, Webb) – Lead vocals: Chris Pearce
 Car Surfin' (Dean, Pearce, Gilling, Webb) – Lead vocals: Chris Pearce
 I Saw The Sun Come Up In Her Eyes (Dean, Pearce, Gilling, Webb) – Lead vocals: Chris Pearce
 My Favourite Barista (Dean, Pearce, Gilling, Webb) – Lead vocals: Chris Pearce

Personnel 
 Chris Pearce – vocals, guitar
 Steve Dean – vocals, bass
 Clive Gilling – vocals, guitar, keyboards
 Ray Webb – vocals, drums, percussion

Producer 
 The Surfin' Lungs

Trivia 
 Ray Webb's first album since Goin To Rockingham 
 At The Weekend is only the second song written by Ray recorded by the group
 The Girl With The Joey Ramone Tattoo is sung and written by Clive

2016 albums
The Surfin' Lungs albums